Nitidulinae is a subfamily of sap-feeding beetles in the family Nitidulidae. There are about 17 genera and at least 70 described species in Nitidulinae.

Genera
These are 17 out of the approximately 110 genera belonging to the subfamily Nitidulinae.

References

Further reading

External links

 

Nitidulidae